I'm the Man is the second album by English musician Joe Jackson, released in October 1979. Released shortly after Jackson's breakthrough debut, Look Sharp!, I'm the Man saw Jackson continue the style of his earlier album. Singles from the album included "I'm the Man" and "It's Different for Girls", the latter of which was his biggest UK chart single, peaking at number five on the UK Singles Chart.

I'm the Man was re-released in 2001 with one bonus track, a live version of "Come On". "Come On" was originally released as the B-side to Jackson's single "I'm the Man", also issued in October 1979.

Background
On the album cover, Jackson appears in the guise of a particular type of petty criminal known in the United Kingdom as a spiv, a character who, in Jackson's own words, "always wears a gross polka-dot tie and a pencil-thin mustache, and he's always trying to sell you a watch or something like that real cheap. I think people always want to put a label on what you do, so I thought I'd be one step ahead of them and invent one myself - spiv rock." Jackson later explained, that the spiv character is "a silly image that I thought appalling. It's not intended to be a new musical revolution."

The album was quickly recorded to follow-up Jackson's successful debut album Look Sharp!. Shortly after Look Sharp's release, Jackson speculated, "Compared to the first album, I think it's a bit more mature. It's getting more interesting as it goes along. The band is getting stronger. I think the band is gonna amaze people on the next album". Since then, the album has been described by Jackson as "Part Two of Look Sharp!". He later said on his website,

I'm the Man was also released as a 7" album (5 - 7" singles) in a package as 'The 7" Album' and included a poster.

John Rzeznik of the Goo Goo Dolls named the album as one of the ten albums that changed his life. Carol Decker of T'Pau similarly praised the album as one of her favorites.

Singles 
Jackson pushed for "I'm the Man" to be the leading single from the album, and professed bemusement when it failed to chart in the US or the UK. (It did reach the top 40 in Canada, peaking at #23.)  The record label then decided on its own to release "It's Different for Girls" which went straight to the UK Top Ten. Jackson later confessed: "I was amazed when that one was a hit." The album's third single, "Kinda Kute", reached number 91 in Canada.

Track listing
All songs written and arranged by Joe Jackson, except where noted. Produced by David Kershenbaum.

Personnel 
 Musicians
 Joe Jackson – vocals, piano, harmonica, melodica
 Gary Sanford – guitar
 Graham Maby – bass, vocals
 David Houghton – drums, vocals

 Production
 Joe Jackson - arrangements
 David Kershenbaum - producer
 Alan Winstanley - recording engineer
 Aldo Bocca - mixing engineer
 Neil King - assistant mixing engineer
 Michael Ross - art direction
 Bruce Rae - cover photography

Covers 
 Fiona Lehn covered "On Your Radio" and Maxine Young covered "It's Different for Girls" on the 2004 album Different for Girls: Women Artists and Female-Fronted Bands Cover Joe Jackson.

Charts
Album

Singles

Certifications

References

External links 
 I'm The Man album information at The Joe Jackson Archive

1979 albums
Joe Jackson (musician) albums
A&M Records albums
Albums produced by David Kershenbaum